Xu Qing (born 22 January 1969), known also as Summer Qing, is a Chinese actress. She was accepted into the acting class of Beijing Film Academy in 1988 and graduated in 1992.

Career
Xu made her debut in the 1990 film Life on a String, directed by Chen Kaige. In 1992, she was nominated for the Hundred Flowers Award for Best Actress with her performance in the film Ripples Across Stagnant Water. The same year, she starred in the television series At the Foot of The Imperial City and gained recognition in China.

In 2001, she renewed her career after portraying Ren Yingying in the television series Laughing in the Wind (2001).

In 2003, Xu won the Audience's Choice for Actress award at the China TV Golden Eagle Award for her performance in spy drama The Chinese Woman at the Gunpoint of Gestapo.

In 2009, Xu portrayed Soong Ching-ling in the Chinese historical film The Founding of a Republic, which won her Best Supporting Actress awards at the Macau International Movie Festival and Hundred Flowers Awards. On November 30, 2009, Xu became a contracted artist under the talent agency Huayi Brothers.

In 2010, she starred in the romance drama Blossoming of Beautiful Flowers, produced by Gao Xixi.

In 2012, she played the wife of Bruce Willis's character in the 2012 American film Looper.

In 2013, Xu won the Huading Awards for Best Drama Actress for her performance in the stage play A Dream Like A Dream.

In 2016, Xu starred in the hit crime drama Mr. Six, which won her the  Hundred Flowers Award for Best Actress award.

In 2017, Xu starred in the American-South African action thriller film 24 Hours to Live.

Filmography

Film

Television series

Awards and nominations

References

External links
 

1969 births
Living people
21st-century Chinese actresses
Chinese film actresses
Chinese television actresses
Beijing Film Academy alumni
Tujia people
Actresses from Beijing
Participants in Chinese reality television series